Aberdeenshire is one of the unitary council areas of Scotland.

Aberdeenshire may also refer to:

Aberdeenshire (historic) a registration county and lieutenancy area of Scotland, also the historic county that was subsumed into Grampian Region in 1975
Aberdeenshire (UK Parliament constituency), a constituency in the Parliaments of Great Britain and the United Kingdom between 1801 and 1868